Pregnenolone may refer to:

 Pregnenolone (pregn-5-en-3β-ol-20-one)
 Pregnenolone (medication)
 3β-Dihydroprogesterone (pregn-4-en-3β-ol-20-one)
 3α-Dihydroprogesterone  (pregn-4-en-3α-ol-20-one)

See also
 Pregnanolone
 Pregneninolone or ethisterone
 Progesterone